Mark Teague (born 1963) is an American author and illustrator of children's books. Teague has illustrated over 40 books including the Poppleton series, the First Graders from Mars series, The Great Gracie Chase, and other favorites.

Biography 
Mark Teague was born in 1963. He grew up in San Diego, California, and went to college at the Paier College of Art in Connecticut in 1985. When he was a child, he started writing books before he could even write. His mother would write the words for him. In interviews Mr. Teague says writing still feels like play to him. He loved books, and was working at Barnes & Noble doing window displays when he decided to write his first book.

Although he had no formal writing training, he quickly became a writer of over 20 children's books. Additionally, he has illustrated over 40 books. Each of Mark Teague's books starts as "notebooks full of sketches and scribbles, strange little drawings and phrases that suddenly come together" he has described in interviews. During his creative process, he doodles and scribbles with no aim. Most of his books address common childhood fears.

Teague's first full-length novel for children, The Doom Machine, was published in October 2009 by Scholastic Inc. Set in 1956, it tells the tale of Jack Creedle, a paperboy whose world is turned upside down when a space shuttle lands in his hometown. Aliens, time machines, and Mark Teague's signature illustrations ensue and he teaches children's book illustration at Hollins University and the Rhode Island School of Design.

Family
He now lives in Austerlitz, New York with his wife, Laura. He has two children.

Works

Self Illustrated
 The Trouble with the Johnsons (1989)
 Moog-Moog, Space Barber (1990)
 Frog Medicine (1991)
 The Field Beyond the Outfield (1992)
 Pigsty (1994)
 How I Spent My Summer Vacation (1995)
 The Secret Shortcut (1996)
 Baby Tamer (1997)
 The Lost and Found (1998)
 One Halloween Night (1999)
 Dear Mrs. LaRue: Letters from Obedience School (2002)
 Detective LaRue: Letters from the Investigation (2004)
 LaRue For Mayor: Letters from the Campaign Trail (2008)
 The Doom Machine (2009)
 LaRue Across America: Postcards from the Vacation (2011)

Illustrator
 What Are Scientists, What Do They Do? (1991)
 Adventures in Lego Land (1991)
 Chris Babcock, No Moon, No Milk! (1993)
 Dick King-Smith, Three Terrible Trins (1994)
 Tony Johnston, The Iguana Brothers, a Tale of Two Lizards (1995)
 Dick King-Smith, Mr. Potter's Pet (1996)
 Audrey Wood, The Flying Dragon Room (1996)
 Audrey Wood, Sweet Dream Pie (1998)
 Cynthia Rylant, The Great Gracie Chase (2001)
 Anne Isaacs, Toby Littlewood (2006)

Collaborations
 Sweet Dream Pie by Audrey Wood, Illustrated by Teague (1998)
 [[Poppleton (book series)|Poppleton series]] by Cynthia Rylant, Illustrated by Teague
 Poppleton (1997)
 Poppleton and Friends (1997)
 Poppleton Forever (1998)
 PoppletonEveryday (1998)
 Poppleton in Fall (1999)
 Poppleton in Spring (1999)
 Poppleton Has Fun (2000)
 Poppleton in Winter (2001)
 First Graders From Mars by Shana Corey, Illustrated by Teague
 Episode 1, Horus's Horrible Day (2001)
 Episode 2, The Problem with Pelly (2002)
 Episode 3, Nergal and the Great Space Race (2002)
 Episode 4, Tera, Star Student (2003)
 Dinosaurs series by Jane Yolen and Mark Teague
 How Do Dinosaurs Say Goodnight? (2000)
 How Do Dinosaurs Get Well Soon? (2003)
 How Do Dinosaurs Clean Their Rooms? (2004)
 How Do Dinosaurs Count to Ten? (2004)
 How Do Dinosaurs Eat Their Food?'' (2005)

References

External links

 Reading rockets

Writers from San Diego
1963 births
Living people
Artists from San Diego
American male writers